Gandhi Bilel Djuna (born 6 May 1986), better known by his stage name Maître Gims and more recently just Gims (sometimes stylized as GIMS), is a DR Congolese singer-songwriter and rapper. He grew up in France and currently lives in France and Morocco. He is a former member of the hip hop group Sexion d'Assaut and released his first major album, Subliminal in 2013. The album sold over a million copies in France and peaked at number two in the Syndicat National de l'Édition Phonographique. His other two albums follow: Mon cœur avait raison in 2015 and Ceinture noire in 2018 reached number one in France and Belgium (Wallonia) and peaked in the top 40 in various European countries, including Denmark, Italy and Switzerland.

He has topped the French singles charts four times, including once as a featured artist, most recently in 2018 with his song "La même". The song was the most performed in France in 2018 and it helped Gims become the most performed artist on French television and radio for the same year. In 2018, he was the 7th most performed artist in the world on Deezer. During his career he has worked with several international artists such as Sia, Pitbull, Lil Wayne, Stromae, Maluma, Sting and others. He has sold over 5 million records, including 3 million albums since the start of his career. in 2020 he won the International Artist of the Year in Distinctive International Arab Festivals Awards after his featuring in Mohamed Ramadan's song "Ya habibi". On 17 September 2020, Netflix released a documentary about the last ten years of his career titled Gims: On the Record.

The discography of Gims consists of four studio albums, five reissues, two compilations and an EPs. It also consists of twenty-nine singles (including twenty-five as a lead artist and four as a collaborating artist), thirty-two collaborations, and thirty-one video clips.

During his career, Gims obtained eight gold discs, six platinum discs, three double platinum discs, three triple platinum discs and three diamond discs. He also obtained thirty-two gold singles, seventeen platinum singles, two double platinum singles, a triple platinum single, a quadruple single platinum, a quintuple single platinum and five diamond singles.

Albums

Solo albums

EPs

Singles

As lead artist

As featured artist 

*Did not appear in the official Belgian Ultratop 50 charts, but rather in the bubbling under Ultratip charts.

Other releases and charted songs

With Sexion d'Assaut

References 

Discography
Discographies of French artists
Hip hop discographies